Gujjadi  also known as Nayakwadi is a village in the southern state of Karnataka, India. It is located in the Kundapura taluk of Udupi district in Karnataka.

Demographics
As of 2001 India census, Gujjadi had a population of 5867 with 2776 males and 3091 females.

See also
 Udupi
 Districts of Karnataka
https://kundapraa.com/kodapadi-guheshwara-temple-gujjadi/

References

External links
 Seema Buthello
 Buthello Family
 Vivek 
 Aashok Naik Gujjadi 
 Immaculateconceptionchurch
 http://Udupi.nic.in/
 http://gangollitimes.com/
 http://wikimapia.org/#lang=en&lat=13.670825&lon=74.662126&z=19&m=b&show=/31131602/Valerian-Buthello-Priya-Villa

Villages in Udupi district